Heinz-Günter Bargfrede is a German politician ( CDU) and former member of the Bundestag.

Life 
Bargfrede joined the CDU in 1971 and was chairman of the Rotenburg municipal association from 1986 to 1990.  He was a member of the German Bundestag from 20 December 1990 to 26 October 1998 (two terms). There he was a full member of the committee for transport.

References 

1942 births
Living people
Members of the Bundestag for Lower Saxony
Members of the Bundestag 1994–1998
Members of the Bundestag 1990–1994
Members of the Bundestag for the Christian Democratic Union of Germany